The 1966 NFL expansion draft was a National Football League (NFL) draft in which a new expansion team, named the Atlanta Falcons, selected its first players.  On June 30, 1965, NFL Commissioner Pete Rozelle awarded the first NFL franchise in the Deep South to the city of Atlanta and granted ownership to Rankin Smith Sr.

So that the Falcons could become competitive with existing teams, the league awarded the Falcons the first pick in the 1966 NFL Draft, supplemented with the final pick in the first five rounds.  The NFL also gave the new team the opportunity to select current players from existing teams.  That selection was provided by the expansion draft, held on February 15, 1966.  In this draft, held six weeks after the regular draft, the existing franchises listed players from which the Falcons could select to switch to the new team.

Each of the 14 established teams froze 29 players on their 40-man rosters that opened the 1965 season (That made 154 players available.). Atlanta picked one of the 11 and then each team froze two more. Atlanta was able to select two more for a total of 42 players chosen. The Falcons paid $8.5 million for the franchise. (February 17, 1966 St. Petersburg Times.)

Player selections

See also 
 Pro Football Hall of Fame – 1966 Draft
 Dbasefootball – 1966 Draft
 1966 American Football League Draft

References 

National Football League expansion draft
Expansion
Atlanta Falcons lists